The Harvard-Belmont Landmark District is a part of Capitol Hill in Seattle, Washington, United States, listed on the National Register of Historic Places.

It is notable for the architectural styles displayed by homes there: Victorian, neoclassical, neo-Georgian, and Colonial. Most were built between 1900 and 1910. The wave of construction by the Seattle wealthy began with Horace C. Henry's 1901 mansion.

References

External links

Historic districts on the National Register of Historic Places in Washington (state)
Victorian architecture in Washington (state)
Colonial Revival architecture in Washington (state)
Tudor Revival architecture in Washington (state)
Neighborhoods in Seattle
Capitol Hill, Seattle
National Register of Historic Places in Seattle